Última Hora was a left-leaning tabloid-style newspaper published in Brazil, established in 1951 by the journalist Samuel Wainer. Initially the paper was published in Rio de Janeiro, later also in São Paulo. It was followed by a national edition, based in São Paulo with local supplements in Niterói, Porto Alegre, Belo Horizonte, Recife, Curitiba, Campinas, Santos, Bauru and the  ABC Region surrounding São Paulo.

In 1971 the paper was taken over by the Folha Group, owners of the Folha de S. Paulo and other publications.

Links 
 Ultima Hora in the digital archives of the Arquivo Público do Estado de São Paulo.

References

Defunct newspapers published in Brazil
Publications established in 1951
1951 establishments in Brazil
1971 disestablishments in Brazil
Publications disestablished in 1971
Portuguese-language newspapers